Ferdows Rural District may refer to:
 Ferdows Rural District (Kerman Province)
 Ferdows Rural District (Shahriar County), Tehran province